Foundations of Cookery was a British television series which aired in 1939 on the BBC. The 15-minute series provided cooking advice. Marcel Boulestin was the host.

The episode telecast 24 February aired at 9:25PM, preceded by news and followed by a cartoon, on a schedule which also included a show about fashion called Vanity Fair, a music programme called Music Makers and an episode of Telecrime. (see page 17)

None of the episodes still exist, as they aired live, and methods used to record live television did not exist until late 1947, and were used very rarely by the BBC until around 1953–1955.

References

External links

1930s British television series
1939 British television series debuts
1939 British television series endings
Lost BBC episodes
BBC Television shows
Black-and-white British television shows
British cooking television shows